The quilts of Gee's Bend are quilts created by a group of women and their ancestors who live or have lived in the isolated African-American hamlet of Gee's Bend, Alabama along the Alabama River. The quilts of Gee's Bend are among the most important African-American visual and cultural contributions to the history of art within the United States. Arlonzia Pettway, Annie Mae Young and Mary Lee Bendolph are among some of the most notable quilters from Gee's Bend. Many of the residents in the community can trace their ancestry back to enslaved people from the Pettway Plantation. Arlonzia Pettway can recall her grandmother's stories of her ancestors, specifically of Dinah Miller, who was brought to the United States by slave ship in 1859.

History 

Just southwest of Selma, in the Black Belt of Alabama, Gee's Bend (officially called Boykin) is an isolated, rural community of about seven hundred inhabitants. The area is named after Joseph Gee, a landowner who came from North Carolina and established a cotton plantation in 1816 with his seventeen slaves. In 1845, the plantation was sold to Mark H. Pettway. Many members of the community still carry the name. After emancipation, many freed slaves and family members stayed on the plantation as sharecroppers.

In the 1930s, Gee's Bend saw a significant shift in their community, as a merchant who had given credit to the families of the Bend died, and the family of this merchant collected on debts owed to him in brutal fashion. These indebted families watched as their food, animals, tools and seed were taken away, and the community was saved by the distribution of Red Cross rations. Much of the land of this area was sold to the federal government and the Farm Security Administration, and those organizations set up Gee's Bend Farms, Inc., a pilot project that was a cooperative-based program intended to help sustain the inhabitants of the area. The government sold tracts of land to the families of the bend, thus giving the Native and African American population control over the land, which at the time was still rare. The community of Gee's Bend was also the subject of several Farm Security Administration photographers, like  Dorothea Lange. During the latter half of the Great Depression the inhabitants of the area faced challenges as farming practices became increasingly mechanized, and consequently, a large portion of the community left.

However, many inhabitants of the community stayed. In 1949, a U.S Post Office was established in Gee's Bend. In 1962, the ferry service, one of the only accesses into Gee's Bend, was eliminated, contributing to the community's isolation. Among other effects, this hindered residents’ ability to register to vote. Ferry service was not restored until 2006.

From the 1960s onward, the community of Gee's Bend, as well as the Freedom Quilting Bee in nearby Alberta, gained attention for the production of their quilts. Folk art collector, historian, and curator William Arnett brought further attention to this artistic production with his Souls Grown Deep Foundation in Atlanta, Georgia. Arnett organized an exhibition titled, "The Quilts of Gee's Bend", which debuted in 2002 at the Museum of Fine Arts in Houston and later travelled to a dozen other locations across the country. The exhibition featured sixty quilts created by forty-five artists. This exhibition brought fame to the quilts. Arnett's management of Gee's Bend quilts was not always viewed positively. In 2007, two Gee's Bend quiltmakers, Annie Mae Young and Loretta Pettway, filed lawsuits saying that Arnett cheated them out of thousands of dollars from the sales of their quilts. The lawsuit was resolved and dismissed without comment from lawyers on either side in 2008.

Despite this former controversy, Arnett's foundation Souls Grown Deep Foundation continues to collect and organize exhibitions for Gees Bend Quilts. The foundation manages multiple campaigns to support Gees Bend Quiltmakers. They aim to provide documentation, marketing, and fund-raising, as well as education and opportunity for quiltmakers. The foundation also involved in a multi-year campaign with the Artists Rights Society to gain intellectual property rights for the artists of Gee's Bend.

Quilts
The quilting tradition in Gee's Bend goes back beyond the 19th century and may have been influenced in part by patterned Native American textiles and African textiles. African-American women pieced together strips of cloth to make bedcovers. Throughout the post-bellum years and into the 20th century, Gee's Bend women made quilts to keep themselves and their children warm in unheated shacks that lacked running water, telephones and electricity. Along the way they developed a distinctive style, noted for its lively improvisations and geometric simplicity. Many of the quilts are a departure from classical quilt making, bringing to mind a minimalist quality. This could also have been influenced by the isolation of their location, which necessitated using whatever materials were on hand, often recycling from old clothing and textiles.

The quilts have been exhibited at the Museum of Fine Arts Houston, the Indianapolis Museum of Art, the Philadelphia Museum of Art, the Tacoma Art Museum, the Whitney Museum of American Art, and the Turner Contemporary in the UK,  among others. The reception of the work has been mostly positive, as Alvia Wardlaw, curator of Modern and Contemporary Art at the Museum of Fine Arts, Houston wrote, "The compositions of these quilts contrast dramatically with the ordered regularity associated with many styles of Euro-American quiltmaking. There's a brilliant, improvisational range of approaches to composition that is more often associated with the inventiveness and power of the leading 20th-century abstract painters than it is with textile-making". The Whitney venue, in particular, brought a great deal of art-world attention to the work, starting with Michael Kimmelman's 2002 review in The New York Times which called the quilts "some of the most miraculous works of modern art America has produced" and went on to describe them as a version of Matisse and Klee arising in the rural South. Comparable effect can be seen in the quilts of isolated individuals such as Rosie Lee Tompkins, but the Gee's Bend quilters had the advantage of numbers and backstory.

In 2003, 50 quilt makers founded the Gee's Bend Collective, which is owned and operated by the women of Gee's Bend. Every quilt sold by the Gee's Bend Quilt Collective is unique and individually produced. In recent years, members of the Collective have traveled nationwide to talk about Gee's Bend's history and their art. Many of the ladies have become well known for their wit, engaging personality and, in some cases, singing abilities.

In 2015, Gee's Bend quilters Mary Lee Bendolph, Lucy Mingo, and Loretta Pettway were joint recipients of a National Heritage Fellowship awarded by the National Endowment for the Arts, which is the United States government's highest honor in the folk and traditional arts.

See also
 African American art
 List of African-American visual artists
 Jessie T. Pettway
Annie Bendolph
 Harriet Powers
 Sue Willie Seltzer

References

Further reading
 
 
 
 
 Documentary video on the Gee’s Bend quilters and a double-CD of Gee’s Bend Gospel Music from 1941 and 2002.

External links

 Craft in America, Season 6, episode: INDUSTRY. PBS documentary series about the craft movement in the United States. This episode includes a segment about the Gee's Bend Quilters, which begins at approximately 4:10, concludes at about 17:10. 
 
 
 

Quilts
American quilters
African-American artists
American artists
Wilcox County, Alabama
Art in Alabama